Eurema senegalensis, the forest grass yellow, is a butterfly in the  family Pieridae. It is found in Guinea (the Nimba Range), Sierra Leone, Liberia, Ivory Coast, Ghana, Togo, Benin, Nigeria, Cameroon, Equatorial Guinea, the Republic of the Congo, the Democratic Republic of the Congo, western Uganda, western Kenya, Tanzania and Zambia. The habitat consists of forests and heavy woodland.

The larvae feed on Hypericum aethiopicum, Acacia, Cassia (including Cassia mimosoides) and Albizia gummifera

References

senegalensis
Butterflies described in 1836
Butterflies of Africa
Taxa named by Jean Baptiste Boisduval